Calvert Hills Historic District is a national historic district in College Park, Prince George's County, Maryland. It is roughly bounded on the north by Calvert Road, on the east by the Green Line metrorail corridor (the former Baltimore and Ohio Railroad right-of-way), on the south by the northern boundary of Riverdale Park, and on the west by Baltimore Avenue (US Route 1). It does not include Calvert Park on the southeast corner. Primarily a middle-class single-family residential neighborhood, it also includes some apartment houses as well as the College Park Post Office, a contributing property at 4815 Calvert Road.

History
The district was developed in the early part of the 20th century by members of the Calvert family who were descendants or other relatives of Charles Benedict Calvert, the owner of Riversdale Plantation and Rossborough Farm and the founder of what is now the University of Maryland, College Park. Calvert Hills was annexed into the city of College Park in 1943.

It was added to the National Register of Historic Places in 2002.

References

External links
, including photo dated 2001, at Maryland Historical Trust
Boundary Map of the Calvert Hills Historic District, Prince George's County, at Maryland Historical Trust

Historic districts in Prince George's County, Maryland
Queen Anne architecture in Maryland
Colonial Revival architecture in Maryland
Houses on the National Register of Historic Places in Maryland
Houses in Prince George's County, Maryland
Historic districts on the National Register of Historic Places in Maryland
National Register of Historic Places in Prince George's County, Maryland